Utne Church is a parish church of the Church of Norway in Ullensvang Municipality in Vestland county, Norway. It is located in the village of Utne, at the northern tip of the Folgefonna peninsula. It is the church for the Utne parish which is part of the Hardanger og Voss prosti (deanery) in the Diocese of Bjørgvin. The white, wooden church was built in a long church design from 1892 until 1895 using plans drawn up by the architect Peter Andreas Blix. The church seats about 300 people.

History
Permission for building a church in Utne was first given on 14 October 1885. In 1886, a piece of land was designated as the cemetery for the future church. The first church built in Utne was built from 1892-1895. The architect was Peter Andreas Blix and the lead builder was Ivar Ivarsson Opedal. The church porch in the west measured   and there was also a small  sacristy off the chancel. The church was consecrated on 5 June 1895 by the Bishop Fredrik Waldemar Hvoslef.

Media gallery

See also
List of churches in Bjørgvin

References

Ullensvang
Churches in Vestland
Long churches in Norway
Wooden churches in Norway
19th-century Church of Norway church buildings
Churches completed in 1895
1895 establishments in Norway